The Recession of 1960–1961 was a recession in the United States. According to the National Bureau of Economic Research the recession lasted for 10 months, beginning in April 1960 and ending in February 1961. The recession preceded the third-longest economic expansion in U.S. history, from February 1961 until the beginning of the Recession of 1969–1970 in December 1969—to date only the 1990s and post-financial crisis (2009-2020) have seen a longer period of growth.

The Federal Reserve had started to tighten monetary policy in 1959 and eased off in 1960.

During this recession, the GDP of the United States fell 1.4 percent. Though the recession ended in November 1960, the unemployment rate did not peak for several more months. In May 1961, the rate reached its height for the cycle of 7.1 percent.

See also
List of recessions in the United States

References

Further reading
 
 
 

Recessions in the United States
1961 in economics
1960 in economics
1960 in the United States
1961 in the United States
Presidency of Dwight D. Eisenhower
Presidency of John F. Kennedy